Donald Binneboese (February 17, 1924 – February 28, 2005) was an American politician who served in the Iowa House of Representatives from the 49th district from 1976 to 1983.

He died on February 28, 2005, in Hinton, Iowa at age 81.

References

1924 births
2005 deaths
Democratic Party members of the Iowa House of Representatives